Bruno Prada (born 31 July 1971 in São Paulo) is a Brazilian sailor.

After sailing Optimists until the age of 14, he moved to the Laser class, where he was Brazilian and South American Junior champion and 7th at Youth Worlds in 1989, and the Snipe class, where he achieved a second place at the Brazilian Junior Nationals, and was 11th at the Junior Worlds in 1988.

In 1989, he changed to the Finn class, becoming Brazilian national champion in 1993, 1997 and 1998, and winning a bronze medal at the 1999 Pan American Games.

He won a silver medal in the Star class with Robert Scheidt at the 2008 Summer Olympics and a bronze in the same category with the same partner at the 2012 Summer Olympics.

References

External links
 
 
 
 
 

1971 births
Living people
Sportspeople from São Paulo
Brazilian male sailors (sport)
Olympic sailors of Brazil
Olympic silver medalists for Brazil
Olympic bronze medalists for Brazil
Olympic medalists in sailing
Medalists at the 2008 Summer Olympics
Medalists at the 2012 Summer Olympics
Sailors at the 2008 Summer Olympics – Star
Sailors at the 2012 Summer Olympics – Star
Pan American Games bronze medalists for Brazil
Sailors at the 1999 Pan American Games
Star class world champions
Snipe class sailors
Finn class sailors
Pan American Games medalists in sailing
World champions in sailing for Brazil
Medalists at the 1999 Pan American Games